|image=
|attendance={{#expr:

 + 14712 + 25403 + 14443 + 9577 + 4664 + 6801 + 10107 + 22383 + 0 + 5277 + 6716 + 8625
 + 14712 + 0 + 0 + 0 + 0 + 7246 + 14000 + 21250 + 0 + 17222 + 0 + 0
 + 0 + 5000 + 11841 + 5000 + 13271 + 5000 + 5000 + 0 + 8000 + 3064 + 14828 + 5000
 + 14000 + 12000 + 6723 + 4000 + 0 + 14500 + 0 + 0 + 8567 + 5000 + 13047 + 5000
 + 8126 + 4672 + 30000 + 28000 + 10307 + 12500 + 16000 + 15328
 + 32604 + 13840 + 14800 + 21125 + 16000 + 22722 + 18196 + 15000
 + 40479 + 16000 + 19066 + 9356
 + 42067 + 15522
 + 59682
}}
|highest attendance  = 42,067 - Leinster v Toulouse14 May 2022
|lowest attendance   = 4,000 - Sale Sharks v Ospreys23 January 2022
|top point scorer =  Johnny Sexton (Leinster)65 points
|top try scorer =  James Lowe (Leinster)10 tries
|matches= 60
|teams=24
|date=10 December 2021 – 28 May 2022
|tournament format=Round-robin and knockout
|countries=
|caption=
|imagesize=
|next tournament=2022–23 European Rugby Champions Cup
}}

The 2021–22 European Rugby Champions Cup (known as the Heineken Champions Cup for sponsorship reasons) was the eighth season of the European Rugby Champions Cup, the annual club rugby union competition run by European Professional Club Rugby (EPCR) for teams from the top six nations in European rugby. It was the 27th season of pan-European professional club rugby competition.

Due to the COVID-19 pandemic, the 24-team, two pool tournament format adopted for the previous season remained.

This is the final year, under the current sponsorship deal, with Dutch beer brand Heineken, after a four-year deal was agreed starting from the 2018/19 season.

The tournament commenced in December 2021. On 28 May 2022, Stade Rochelais won the final at Stade Vélodrome in Marseille, France, defeating Leinster 24 points to 21.

Teams 
Twenty-four clubs from the three major European domestic and regional leagues are competing in the Champions Cup. 

The distribution of the teams are:
 England: eight clubs
 The top eight clubs from Premiership Rugby
 France: eight clubs
 The top seven clubs from the Top 14
 Montpellier automatically qualify as Challenge Cup champions despite not finishing in the top 8.
 Ireland, Italy, Scotland, Wales: eight clubs
 The top four sides in each conference from the previous season's Pro14 (now known as United Rugby Championship).

The following teams have qualified for the tournament as of 12 June 2021.

Team details
Below is the list of coaches, captain and stadiums with their method of qualification for each team.

Note: Placing shown in brackets, denotes standing at the end of the regular season for their respective leagues, with their end of season positioning shown through CH for Champions, RU for Runner-up, SF for losing Semi-finalist, and QF for losing Quarter-finalist.

Seeding and draw
The twenty four teams are seeded based on their finishing position in end of season playoffs and league positions. This follows the format from the previous season with the number 1 and number 2 ranked clubs from each league in Tier 1, the number 3 and number 4 ranked clubs in Tier 2, the number 5 and 6 ranked clubs in Tier 3, and the number 7 and number 8 ranked clubs in Tier 4.

The draw took place on 21 July 2021 in Lausanne, Switzerland.

Pool Stage

Teams are awarded four points for a win, two for a draw, one for scoring four tries in a game, and one for losing by less than eight points.

Pool A

Pool B

Knockout stage
The knockout stage began across the 8/9/10 April with a home and away round of 16 matches consisting of the top eight ranked teams from each pool.

Bracket

Round of 16

First leg

Second leg

Quarter-finals

Semi-finals

Final

See also
 2021–22 EPCR Challenge Cup

Notes

References 

 
Champions Cup
European Rugby Champions Cup
European Rugby Champions Cup
European Rugby Champions Cup
European Rugby Champions Cup
European Rugby Champions Cup
European Rugby Champions Cup
European Rugby Champions Cup seasons